House of Commons Disqualification Act (with its variations) is a stock short title used in the United Kingdom for legislation relating those ineligible to serve as members of the House of Commons.

List
The House of Commons (Disqualification) Act 1693
The House of Commons Disqualification Act 1957
The House of Commons Disqualification Act 1975

The House of Commons (Disqualifications) Acts 1715 to 1821 is the collective title of the following Acts:
The Crown Pensioners Disqualification Act 1715 (1 Geo 1 st 2 c 56)
The House of Commons (Disqualification) Act 1741 (15 Geo 2 c 22)
The House of Commons (Disqualifications) Act 1782 (22 Geo 3 c 45)
The House of Commons (Disqualifications) Act 1801 (41 Geo 3 c 52)
The House of Commons (Clergy Disqualification) Act 1801 (41 Geo 3 c 63)
The Members of Parliament (Bankruptcy) Act 1812 (52 Geo 3 c 144)
The House of Commons (Disqualifications) Act 1813 (54 Geo 3 c 16)
The House of Commons (Disqualifications) Act 1821 (1 & 2 Geo 4 c 44)

See also
List of short titles

References

Lists of legislation by short title